Walter Bobbie (born November 18, 1945) is an American theatre director, choreographer, and occasional actor and dancer. Bobbie has directed both musicals and plays on Broadway and Off-Broadway, and was the Artistic Director of the New York City Center Encores! concert series. He directed the long-running revival of the musical Chicago.

Early life
Bobbie was born in Scranton, Pennsylvania, and attended the University of Scranton and did graduate work at The Catholic University of America. His family was Polish Roman Catholic, and his father was a coal miner.
 
Bobbie explains what inspired him to work in theater: "My first Broadway show was How to Succeed in Business Without Really Trying, maybe in 1964. I came in to New York from college in Pennsylvania for the World's Fair...I remember sitting there — I practically had to be held down in my seat — and I had never seen anything like it. That day it was clear to me that I wanted to come back to New York, and theater was what I wanted to do. It was transforming."

Performer
As a performer, Bobbie played Roger in the Broadway production of Grease in 1972. He was featured in the 1976 Broadway revival of Going Up, and he also starred on Broadway as Nicely-Nicely Johnson in the 1992 revival of Guys and Dolls, for which he received a Drama Desk Award nomination for Outstanding Featured Actor in a Musical. Bobbie portrayed Comptroller Schub in the 1995 concert production of Anyone Can Whistle at Carnegie Hall.

Writer and director
In 1993 Bobbie wrote the book for, and directed, the Roundabout Theatre production of the Rodgers and Hammerstein revue A Grand Night for Singing, for which he received a Tony Award nomination for Best Book of a Musical. The New York Times reviewer wrote of Bobbie's direction that he "has given its Broadway elaboration an impressive fluidity that whisks the performers through various groupings with a minimum of stiffness and posturing. In Mr. Bobbie's hands, the songs flow together in a sequence that treats them as lighthearted extensions of one another."

He then directed the 1996 Broadway revival of Chicago with Ann Reinking and Bebe Neuwirth. Bobbie's 1996 revival of Chicago was inspired by his own staged concert production at City Center Encores!. The concert was a hit, and the musical moved directly to Broadway with its original Encores! cast. Ben Brantley, in reviewing the Encores! concert, noted "As directed by Walter Bobbie and choreographed by Ann Reinking, who also stars, 'Chicago' still stings like cheap whisky, but it also bubbles like vintage Champagne." He won the Tony Award for Best Direction of a Musical for Chicago.

Bobbie next directed the Broadway productions of the stage musical Footloose in 1998, and co-wrote the book. He co-wrote and directed The Road to Hollywood, a new musical performed at the Goodspeed Opera House in 2002.

Bobbie directed the 2004 Roundabout Theater production of Twentieth Century with Alec Baldwin and Anne Heche, as well as the 2005 Sweet Charity revival with Christina Applegate, and then High Fidelity in 2006. Bobbie also directed the one-night-only 2005 concert of South Pacific, a benefit for Carnegie Hall, starring Reba McEntire and Brian Stokes Mitchell.

The musical White Christmas which he directed had limited engagements on Broadway in November 2008 through January 2009 and again in November 2009 through January 2010. Bobbie received the 2009 Drama Desk Award nomination for Outstanding Director of a Musical.

Bobbie directed the New York premiere of The Savannah Disputations by Evan Smith at the Off-Broadway Playwrights Horizons in 2009, with Marylouise Burke, Dana Ivey, Kellie Overby and Reed Birney.  In regional theatre, he directed the new Terrence McNally play Golden Age at the Kennedy Center in 2010.

Artistic director
Bobbie was the artistic director of the New York City Center Encores! concert series in 1995 and 1996, and also directed the staged concerts of Fiorello! (1994), Tenderloin (2000), and Golden Boy (2002). For Du Barry Was a Lady (1996) he co-adapted the book. He directed the 2008 production of No, No, Nanette. He appeared in Face the Music in 2007 with The New York Times reviewer writing: "A last, affectionate word for Mr. Bobbie, whose career took off in another direction when his staging of 'Chicago' for the Encores! series became a Broadway smash. As the harried Hal Reisman...he breathes fresh comic life into even some of the hoariest routines."

References

External links

1945 births
Living people
American choreographers
American male dancers
American male film actors
American male stage actors
American male television actors
University of Scranton alumni
Catholic University of America alumni
Actors from Scranton, Pennsylvania
American people of Polish descent
Catholics from Pennsylvania